Shah Faruk Anwar is an Indian politician in the All India Majlis-e-Ittehadul Muslimeen party. He was elected as a member of the Maharashtra Legislative Assembly from Dhule City on 24 October 2019. [Former Deputy Mayor] Dhule municipal Corporation He won the 2019 assembly elections by 3307 votes against independent candidate Rajwardhan. Member of Maharashtra State Board Of Waqf.

References

1974 births
Living people
All India Majlis-e-Ittehadul Muslimeen politicians
People from Dhule
Maharashtra MLAs 2019–2024
Nationalist Congress Party politicians from Maharashtra